Siakol is a 4-piece Filipino rock band who is one of the several groups who spearheaded the 90's Philippine alternative rock explosion and known for their hit songs "Lakas Tama", "Peksman", "Kanto", "Biyaheng Impyerno"  and "Bakit Ba". The band was a prominent fixture of the Tunog Kalye era and very popular to college & high school students in the Philippines during the 90s.

Etymology
As per the band members, Siakol is a term they coin which pertains to a "free, happy and sometimes naughty state of mind". It is also alluded to be a word play of jakol, Filipino slang for masturbation. Furthermore, according to former frontman Noel Palomo in another interview, "Siakol" was already a popular term coined by the bystanders at their area in their hometown of Parañaque before the band was formed and later suggested the name to their band's management during their early days. The management initially tried to change the spelling of the name to "Shock Call" before it was reverted back to Siakol.

Background
Formed in 1994 by former best friends Manuel "Noel" Palomo and Chris Laurence "Wowie" Flores, their appearance as a guest in a “Battle of the Bands” competition together as a quintet with Anthony "Miniong" Cervantes, Reynaldo "Wally" Gaspar and Rolando "Oyie" Bunao in their hometown of Parañaque was their first exposure. The band started writing original compositions (mostly written by Palomo) and their songs were well received by the public. They were then managed by Jason Gerodias. Peter Paul Plazon of another 90's Pinoy rock band Grin Department has been their longest serving drummer since he joined in 2012.

Their songs from their 1996 album until present still receives massive radio airplay and guestings in several fiestas around the Philippines. Known for their all-Tagalog songs, the band is branded by many as "the face of the Tunog Kalye era" (colloquial term of the Philippines' brand of OPM alternative rock which is popular among the masses in the 1990s, literally translated to "street sound" in English).

The band's brand of lyrics are primarily based on Filipino pop culture, typical Filipino love life and observational humor. They are considered to be one of the most successful OPM bands of all time. Their songs have been one of the most frequently sang in Philippine videokes up to the present.

Notable founding members Noel Palomo and Miniong Cervantes, who had been in the band since its inception, left the band around 2019–2020 due to an apparent internal rift with other members, citing Palomo's silent intention on going solo allegedly as the primary reason. Palomo is currently performing under the group "Noel Palomo & The Repakol" while Cervantes plays session and collaborates with other artists, including Palomo's Repakol. Their positions were later filled in by new members. New frontman Warren Antig Aurin was a finalist of GMA-7's Pinoy Idol in 2008 and also a member of the band Roots of Nature who was Philippines' representative at the Global Battle of the Bands. Marquel Martin on the other hand is also a member of another 90s Pinoy rock band The Youth.

Band name dispute
Since 2020, Palomo, and later Cervantes, who are now both members of Repakol, have been alternatively using the name "Siakol" again aside from the name "Repakol", despite their previous statements that they were no longer part of the band since early 2020. Sole remaining original member Wowie Flores has issued a statement that the band will be seeking legal advice regarding on the matter.

Members
Warren Antig Aurin – lead vocals (2020–present)
Wowie Flores – bass guitar (1994–present)
Marquel Martin – all guitars, backing vocals (2020–present)
Peter Paul Plazon – drums and percussion (2012–present)

Former members
Noel Palomo – lead vocals, occasional rhythm and acoustic guitar, chief songwriter (1994–2020)
Miniong Cervantes – lead and rhythm guitars, backing vocals (1994–2019)
Oyie Bunao† – drums and percussion (1994–2003)
James "Blauff" Rodriguez – drums and percussion (2003–2012); formerly live session rhythm and lead guitars, and bass guitar (2000–2003)
Wally Gaspar – rhythm and lead guitars (1994–1996)

Touring members
Chokoy Pasagui – lead and rhythm guitars (2016)

Repakol faction
("Original Siakol" claimants since the 2020 name dispute)
Noel Palomo – lead vocals
Miniong Cervantes – all guitars, backing vocals
Alvin Palomo – all guitars
Wilbert Jimenez – all guitars, bass guitar
Raz Itum – bass guitar
Zach Alcasid – drums and percussions
Henry San Juan – drums and percussions

Discography

Albums

Notable songs

"Lakas Tama"
"Peksman"
"Bakit Ba"
"Aso"
"Rekta"
"Balang Araw"
"No Problem (Kapag Ikaw Ang Kasama)"
"Itigil Na Natin"
"Muli Bang Makikita"
"Ikaw Lamang"
"Pagmamahal"
"Inday"
"Balewala"
"Malaya Ba"
"Biyaheng Impiyerno"
"Sige Na, Tuloy Pa"
"Sa Pag-ikot ng Mundo"
"Wag Mong Isipin 'Yon"
"D'yan Sa Buhay Mo"
"Ayoko Na Sa'yo"
"Habang Ang Lahat"
"Yakap"
"Gabay"
"Matulog Ka Na"
"Hindi Mo Ba Alam"
"Ikaw Lamang"
"Manibela"
"Hiwaga"
"Inihaw"
"Iniwan Mo Akong Nag-Iisa"
"Kanto"
"Lagim"
"Maligayang Pasko"
"Karoling"
"Ngayong Pasko"
"Ikaw Ba 'Yan"
"Sa Isang Bote Ng Alak"
"Malapit Na"
"Kabilang Mundo"
"Teka Lang"
"Gobyerno"
"Kung Walang Ikaw"
"Aanhin"
"Basted"
"Tropa"
"Gawing Langit ang Mundo"
"Ituloy Mo Lang"
"Asahan Mo"
"P.I."
"Tropa"
"Rakenrol"
"Walang Gano'n"
"Bahay-Bahayan"
"Akala Ko'y Langit"
"Droga"
"Imadyinin Mo"
"Parang Mali"
"Solb Ka Na Naman"
"Mas Masaya Sa Pilipinas"
"Hagupit"
"Di Susuko"

References

External links
Siakol on Last.FM
 – original page with Noel Palomo
 – new official page

Filipino rock music groups
Musical groups established in 1994
Musical groups from Metro Manila